The 1997 DFB-Pokal Final decided the winner of the 1996–97 DFB-Pokal, the 54th season of Germany's premier knockout football cup competition. It was played on 14 June 1997 at the Olympiastadion in Berlin. VfB Stuttgart won the match 2–0 against third-division Energie Cottbus to claim their third cup title.

Route to the final
The DFB-Pokal began with 64 teams in a single-elimination knockout cup competition. There were a total of five rounds leading up to the final. Teams were drawn against each other, and the winner after 90 minutes would advance. If still tied, 30 minutes of extra time was played. If the score was still level, a penalty shoot-out was used to determine the winner.

Note: In all results below, the score of the finalist is given first (H: home; A: away).

Match

Details

References

External links
 Match report at kicker.de 
 Match report at WorldFootball.net
 Match report at Fussballdaten.de 

VfB Stuttgart matches
FC Energie Cottbus matches
1996–97 in German football cups
1997
May 1997 sports events in Europe
1997 in Berlin
Football competitions in Berlin